Lino Francisco Celaya Luria (23 September 1949 – 18 November 2014) was a Mexican politician affiliated with the New Alliance Party (formerly to the Institutional Revolutionary Party).  He served as Deputy of the LIX Legislature of the Mexican Congress as a plurinominal representative (2003–2006).

He died on November 18, 2014 due to pancreatic cancer.

References

1949 births
2014 deaths
People from Oaxaca City
Members of the Chamber of Deputies (Mexico)
Institutional Revolutionary Party politicians
New Alliance Party (Mexico) politicians
Deaths from cancer in Mexico
Deaths from pancreatic cancer
Deputies of the LIX Legislature of Mexico